Alexander Gruber was a German bobsledder who competed in the 1930s. He won a gold medal in the four-man event at the 1935 FIBT World Championships in St. Moritz.

References
Bobsleigh four-man world championship medalists since 1930

German male bobsledders
Possibly living people
Year of birth missing